There are two townlands with the name Newtown, in the Barony of Ikerrin in County Tipperary, Ireland. 
Newtown in the civil parish of Bourney
Newtown in the civil parish of Corbally
There are nineteen townlands known as Newtown in the whole of County Tipperary.

References

Townlands of County Tipperary